Nancy Priddy is an American actress and singer-songwriter. As an actress, she has appeared on many television series, including Bewitched, The Waltons, and Matlock. She is the mother of actress Christina Applegate.

Early life
Priddy was born in South Bend, Indiana to Katherina Iona (née Driggs) and Carl C. Priddy.

Career
In the summers of 1961 and 1962, Priddy performed in musical revues as part of the Party-Liners group at the Peninsula Players theater near Fish Creek, Wisconsin. She was a member of The Bitter End Singers in 1964, a short-lived folksinging group along with Lefty Baker, Tina Bohlmann, Bob Hider, Norris O'Neill, and Vilma Vaccaro. In 1968, she released the album You've Come This Way Before, described by Billboard as "a minor classic of psychedelic folk" and by an Allmusic reviewer as "an off-the-wall singer/songwriter album drawing from both folk-rock and psychedelia". That same year she contributed backup vocals to Leonard Cohen's debut album Songs of Leonard Cohen. At one point she dated Stephen Stills and was the inspiration for his Buffalo Springfield song "Pretty Girl Why".

After years of being away from the recording studio, she returned in 2007 to record Christina's Carousel, released in early 2008.

Family
Priddy is the mother of actress Christina Applegate, and has appeared with her in several projects, including the television series Married... with Children and the film The Sweetest Thing. Like her daughter, Priddy is a breast cancer survivor.

References

External links

Living people
20th-century American actresses
20th-century American singers
20th-century American women singers
21st-century American actresses
21st-century American singers
21st-century American women singers
Actors from South Bend, Indiana
Actresses from Indianapolis
American film actresses
American folk singers
American television actresses
American women singer-songwriters
Musicians from Indianapolis
Musicians from South Bend, Indiana
Oberlin College alumni
Singer-songwriters from Indiana
Year of birth missing (living people)